p-Dioxanone (1,4-dioxan-2-one) is the lactone of 2-(2-hydroxyethoxy)acetic acid. It is a monomer that can undergo ring-opening polymerization to give polydioxanone, a biodegradable implant material. It is isomeric to trimethylene carbonate (1,3-dioxan-2-one).

Preparation 
The common synthetic process for p-dioxanone is continuous gas-phase dehydrogenation of diethylene glycol on a copper or copper chromite catalyst at 280 °C.

This gives yields of up to 86%. Removal of excess diethylene glycol is crucial to the stability of the product as a monomer. Further purification with recrystallization, vacuum distillation, or melt crystallization allows purities of >99.5% to be achieved.

Properties 
Pure p-dioxanone is a white crystalline solid with a melting point of 28 °C.

Uses 
The oxidation of p-dioxanone with nitric acid or dinitrogen tetroxide gives diglycolic acid at 75% yield.

p-Dioxanone can undergo ring-opening polymerization catalyzed by organic compounds of tin, such as tin(II) octoate or dibutyltin dilaurate, or by basic alkoxides such as aluminium isopropoxide. This affords polydioxanone, a biodegradable, semicrystalline and thermally labile polymer with uses in industry and medicine. Depolymerization back to the monomer is triggered at 100 °C.

References

Dioxanes
Lactones